Tobias Duffner (born 5 December 1983) is a German former professional footballer who played as a goalkeeper.

Career
Duffner made his professional debut for Kickers Emden on 31 March 2009 in the 3. Liga against SpVgg Unterhaching.

References

External links
 
 

1983 births
Living people
People from Leer (district)
German footballers
Footballers from Lower Saxony
Association football goalkeepers
SV Werder Bremen players
SV Werder Bremen II players
VfB Oldenburg players
Holstein Kiel players
Holstein Kiel II players
Kickers Emden players
VfR Neumünster players
TuRU Düsseldorf players
3. Liga players